Delaware Township is the name of three townships in the U.S. state of Indiana:

 Delaware Township, Delaware County, Indiana
 Delaware Township, Hamilton County, Indiana
 Delaware Township, Ripley County, Indiana

Indiana township disambiguation pages